Turuvekere is a panchayat town and Taluk in Tumakuru district in the Indian state of Karnataka.

Geography
It has an average elevation of 794 metres (2604 feet).

Demographics
 India census, Turuvekere had a population of 13,275. Males constitute 52% of the population and females 48%. Turuvekere has an average literacy rate of 73%, higher than the national average of 59.5%: male literacy is 78%, and female literacy is 69%. In Turuvekere, 11% of the population is under 6 years of age.

History 

Turuvekere was once an "Agrahara" or "Rent-Free Village" granted to scholarly Brahmins in the 13th century A.D.

Temples

Turuvekere is home to a number of Hoysala temples, including the Temple of Chennakeshava Temple built by Mahadandanayaka Somanna, the Gangadhareshwara Temple, Chennigaraya Swamy Temple, Moole Shankareshwara Temple, and the largest, Beterayaswamy Temple.

 Kanchiraaya Swamy temple is located on top of a hill near Neeragunda and Ajjanahalli villages.  This place is 12 km from Kibbanahalli cross and 4 km from Aralaguppe.
 Hulikeramma temple in Hulikere
 Sri Ranganathaswamy temple is located on top of hill at Aremallenehalli village, around 10 km from Turuvekere.
 Udusalammadevi temple - Adbuta Sidi.
 Beteraya swamy temple - Bramharathotsava.
 Veerabadreshwaraswamy temple - Agnikunda Mahothsava.
 Honnadevi Temple - Dandinashivara
 Nooraondhu gudi - which is known for its rare kind of saligramas.
 Sri Ranganathaswamy and Honnamma devi temple Muniyuru
 Sri Shanidevara temple, Attikullepalya, Muniyuru village

Notable people 
 Master Hirannayya - drama artist from Kanathur village of Turuvekere taluk.
 Jaggesh - noted Kannada actor is from Mayasandra village of Turuvekere taluk.

See also
Ajjenahalli, Turuvekere

References 

Cities and towns in Tumkur district